The ISU Junior Grand Prix of Figure Skating (titled the ISU Junior Series in the 1997–98 season) is a series of international junior-level competitions organized by the International Skating Union. Medals are awarded in the disciplines of men's singles, ladies' singles, pair skating, and ice dancing. The series was inaugurated in 1997 to complement the senior-level ISU Grand Prix of Figure Skating. Skaters earn qualifying points at each Junior Grand Prix event and the six highest-ranking qualifiers meet at the ISU Junior Grand Prix Final, which is held concurrently with the Grand Prix of Figure Skating Final.

History 
The ISU Junior Series was established in the 1997–98 season. Six qualifying competitions took place from late August to early November 1997, leading to the final, which was held in early March 1998. The following season, the series was expanded to eight qualifying events and renamed the ISU Junior Grand Prix.

The series was composed of seven qualifying competitions in the 2001–02 season after U.S. Figure Skating cancelled its event in Arizona following the September 11, 2001 attacks, and returned to eight the following year. The International Skating Union permanently reduced the number of qualifying competitions to seven beginning in the 2009–10 season.

The ISU officially cancelled the events of the 2020–21 season due to the COVID-19 pandemic, citing increased travel and entry requirements between countries and potentially excessive sanitary and health care costs for hosting members.

Competitions 
There are generally seven qualifying events which lead to a final. All seven hold competitions in men's singles, ladies singles, and ice dancing. Four or five of the events also include a pairs competition. The locations of the ISU Junior Grand Prix events change yearly. The eighth event is the ISU Junior Grand Prix Final. Beginning in the 2008–09 season, it has been held concurrently with the senior final.

Qualifying 
Unlike the senior ISU Grand Prix of Figure Skating, competitors are entered by their national federations rather than seeded by the ISU. The number of entries allotted to each ISU member federation is determined by the country's placements at the previous season's World Junior Championships in each respective discipline.

The host country is allowed to enter up to three skaters/teams in singles and dance, with no limit on its pair entries. For a number of years, pairs were allowed to compete on both the junior and senior Grand Prix series in the same season but this option was removed before the 2012–13 season.

Eligibility 
To be eligible for the Junior Grand Prix series, skaters must be at least 13 but not 19 (or 21 for male pair skaters and ice dancers) before the preceding July 1. A skater must meet the age requirement before it turns July 1 in their place of birth. For example, Adelina Sotnikova was born a few hours into July 1, 1996 in Moscow and consequently, was not eligible to compete until the 2010–11 season.

References

External links 

 ISU Junior Grand Prix of Figure Skating at the International Skating Union
 Official ISU videos at International Skating Union's YouTube channel

 
Figure skating tours and series
World youth sports competitions